Manifestation is the act of becoming manifest, to become perceptible to the senses.

Manifestation may also refer to:

 Manifestation of conscience, a practice in religious orders
 Manifestation of God (Baháʼí Faith), the prophets of the Bahá'í Faith
 Materialization (paranormal), also called manifestation, the creation or appearance of matter from unknown sources
Manifestation (popular psychology), various pseudoscientific self-help strategies
 Manifestation (Malevolent Creation album), 2000
 Manifestation (Cloak of Altering album), 2015
 The Manifestation, a 2004 album by Six Organs of Admittance

See also
 Epiphany (disambiguation)
 Theophany, the manifestation of a deity in an observable way